Paraplatoides is a genus of South Pacific jumping spiders that was first described by Marek Michał Żabka in 1992.

Species
 it contains seven species, found only in Australia and on New Caledonia:
Paraplatoides caledonicus (Berland, 1932) – New Caledonia
Paraplatoides christopheri Zabka, 1992 – Australia (Queensland)
Paraplatoides darwini Waldock, 2009 – Australia (Western Australia)
Paraplatoides hirsti Zabka, 1992 – Australia (South Australia)
Paraplatoides longulus Zabka, 1992 – Australia (Queensland)
Paraplatoides niger Zabka, 1992 – Australia (New South Wales to Tasmania)
Paraplatoides tenerrimus (L. Koch, 1879) (type) – Australia (Queensland)

References

Salticidae genera
Salticidae
Spiders of Oceania